VOXEL-MAN is the name of a set of a computer programs for creation and visualization of three-dimensional digital models of the human body derived from cross-sectional images of computer tomography, magnetic resonance tomography or photography (e. g. the Visible Human Project). It was developed at the University Medical Center Hamburg-Eppendorf. Applications include diagnostic imaging,  digital anatomical atlases and surgery simulators. The 3D interactive atlases of anatomy and radiology for brain/skull (published 1998) and inner organs (published 2000) are available for free download. The name Voxel-Man is derived from the term voxel, the elementary cuboid component of a digital representation of a three-dimensional object ( a "three dimensional pixel"). Occasionally the name Voxel-Man is also used as a general term for a digital representation of the human body.

References

External links 
 VOXEL-MAN Interactive 3D-Atlases of Anatomy and Radiology (free download)
 VOXEL-MAN Surgery Simulators and Virtual Body Models
 Historic Video 1986-1991
 VOXEL-MAN - The Virtual Patient-Achievements of the VOXEL-MAN-Project

Medical software